Nathaniel Malcolm Millar (10 May 1915 – 3 June 2011) was a New Zealand fencer who won a silver medal at the 1950 British Empire Games.

Born in the Dunedin suburb of Roslyn on 10 May 1915, Millar was the son of Daisy Stewart Millar (née Carrodus) and David Young Malcolm Millar. During World War II he served as a petty officer in the Royal New Zealand Navy, and on 9 February 1943 he married Patricia Anne Jenks at St Matthew's Church in Auckland.

He won the silver medal alongside Charles Dearing, Austen Gittos and Murray Gittos as part of the men's foil team at the 1950 British Empire Games.

Millar died in Hamilton on 3 June 2011.

References

1915 births
2011 deaths
Sportspeople from Dunedin
Royal New Zealand Navy personnel of World War II
New Zealand male foil fencers
Fencers at the 1950 British Empire Games
Commonwealth Games silver medallists for New Zealand
Commonwealth Games medallists in fencing
Medallists at the 1950 British Empire Games